Enolmis abenhumeya is a moth of the family Scythrididae. It was described by Ramón Agenjo Cecilia  in 1951. It is found in Spain.

References

Scythrididae
Moths described in 1951